Bugando Medical Centre (BMC) is a tertiary care medical facility owned by the Episcopal Conference of the Catholic Bishops of Tanzania. The hospital is operated in collaboration with the Tanzania Ministry of Health and Social Welfare.

Location
The facility is located in the city of Mwanza, in Mwanza Region, along the southern shores of Lake Victoria. The geographical coordinates of the hospital are: 2°31'41.0"S, 32°54'27.0"E (Latitude:-2.528056; Longitude:32.907500).

Overview
BMC is a tertiary referral, research, teaching center and cancer treatment hospital affiliated with the Catholic University of Health and Allied Sciences. BMC's inpatient bed capacity is 950, spanning a wide range of medical and surgical specialties. The hospital employs over 1,300 staff.

Bugando Cancer Centre
In Tanzania, an estimated 35,000 new cases of cancer were diagnosed in 2014, of whom about 21,000 (60 percent) died that same year. The country has only two cancer hospitals, the main one, Ocean Road Cancer Institute, is located in the financial capital, Dar es Salaam. The cancer unit at Bugando Medical Centre is the second and only other public cancer treatment centre to cater for the estimated 58 million Tanzania's citizens. In February 2021 a total of TSh1.34 billion (approx. US$580,000) was raised at the hospital as part of funding to expand and modernize the facility. When completed the Bugando Cancer Centre, will have capacity to attend to 120 patients on a daily basis.

History
This hospital was built by the Catholic Church between 1968 and 1977. It was officially opened on 3 November 1971, by Tanzania's founding president, Julius Nyerere. In 1972 the Hospital was nationalized by the Government. However, 13 years later, it was  handed back to the Catholic Church in Tanzania, with the understanding that the hospital be run as a regional referral hospital for the Lake Zone, spanning 8 of Tanzania's 31 regions (total population 14 million in 2017), with the collaboration of the Government of Tanzania.

Services
As of 2017, BMC offered specialist services in the following clinical areas:

 Ophthalmology
 Ear, Nose and Throat
 Urology
 General Surgery
 Neurosurgery
 Plastic Surgery
 Dental and Maxillofacial Surgery
 Orthopedic Surgery
 Cardiothoracic Surgery
 Obstetrics and Gynaecology
 Pediatric and Child Health
 Cardiology
 Gastroentology
 Nephrology
 Endocrinology
 Infectious Diseases (including HIV/AIDS and Tuberculosis)
 Dermatology
 Internal Medicine
 Emergency Medicine
 Anesthesiology and Critical Care
 Pain Management
 General Paediatrics
 Psychiatry
 Oncology (Cancer Care)
 Nuclear Medicine
 Radiotherapy.

See also
 List of hospitals in Tanzania

References

External links
 Website of Bugando Medical Centre
 White Paper of The Foundatuion for Cancer Care In Tanzania As of 2015.

Medical research institutes in Tanzania
Buildings and structures in Tanzania
Cancer organisations based in Tanzania
Hospital buildings completed in 1977
Hospitals in Tanzania